The following lists events that happened during 2000 in Japan. It corresponds to the year Heisei 12 in the Japanese calendar.

Incumbents
 Emperor: Akihito
 Prime Minister: Keizo Obuchi (L–Gunma) until April 5, Yoshiro Mori (L–Ishikawa)
 Chief Cabinet Secretary: Mikio Aoki (Councillor, L–Shimane) until July 4, Hidenao Nakagawa (L–Hiroshima) until October 27, Yasuo Fukuda (L–Gunma)
 Chief Justice of the Supreme Court: Shigeru Yamaguchi
 President of the House of Representatives: Sōichirō Itō (L–Miyagi) until June 2, Tamisuke Watanuki (L–Toyama) from July 4
 President of the House of Councillors: Jūrō Saitō (L–Mie) until October 19, Yutaka Inoue (L–Chiba)
 Diet sessions: 147th (regular, January 20 to June 2), 148th (special, July 4 to July 6), 149th (extraordinary, July 28 to August 9), 150th (extraordinary, September 21 to December 1)

Governors
Aichi Prefecture: Masaaki Kanda 
Akita Prefecture: Sukeshiro Terata 
Aomori Prefecture: Morio Kimura 
Chiba Prefecture: Takeshi Numata 
Ehime Prefecture: Moriyuki Kato 
Fukui Prefecture: Yukio Kurita
Fukuoka Prefecture: Wataru Asō 
Fukushima Prefecture: Eisaku Satō
Gifu Prefecture: Taku Kajiwara 
Gunma Prefecture: Hiroyuki Kodera 
Hiroshima Prefecture: Yūzan Fujita 
Hokkaido: Tatsuya Hori
Hyogo Prefecture: Toshitami Kaihara 
Ibaraki Prefecture: Masaru Hashimoto 
Ishikawa Prefecture: Masanori Tanimoto
Iwate Prefecture: Hiroya Masuda 
Kagawa Prefecture: Takeki Manabe 
Kagoshima Prefecture: Tatsurō Suga 
Kanagawa Prefecture: Hiroshi Okazaki 
Kochi Prefecture: Daijiro Hashimoto 
Kumamoto Prefecture: Joji Fukushima (until 25 February); Yoshiko Shiotani (starting 16 April)
Kyoto Prefecture: Teiichi Aramaki 
Mie Prefecture: Masayasu Kitagawa 
Miyagi Prefecture: Shirō Asano 
Miyazaki Prefecture: Suketaka Matsukata 
Nagano Prefecture: Gorō Yoshimura (until 26 October); Yasuo Tanaka (starting 26 October)
Nagasaki Prefecture: Genjirō Kaneko 
Nara Prefecture: Yoshiya Kakimoto
Niigata Prefecture: Ikuo Hirayama 
Oita Prefecture: Morihiko Hiramatsu 
Okayama Prefecture: Masahiro Ishii 
Okinawa Prefecture: Keiichi Inamine
Osaka Prefecture: Yoshiki Kimura (until 8 February); Fusae Ōta (starting 8 February)
Saga Prefecture: Isamu Imoto 
Saitama Prefecture: Yoshihiko Tsuchiya
Shiga Prefecture: Yoshitsugu Kunimatsu 
Shiname Prefecture: Nobuyoshi Sumita 
Shizuoka Prefecture: Yoshinobu Ishikawa 
Tochigi Prefecture: Fumio Watanabe (until 8 December); Akio Fukuda (starting 9 December)
Tokushima Prefecture: Toshio Endo 
Tokyo: Shintarō Ishihara 
Tottori Prefecture: Yoshihiro Katayama 
Toyama Prefecture: Yutaka Nakaoki
Wakayama Prefecture: Isamu Nishiguchi (until 2 September); Yoshiki Kimura (starting 3 September)
Yamagata Prefecture: Kazuo Takahashi 
Yamaguchi Prefecture: Sekinari Nii 
Yamanashi Prefecture: Ken Amano

Events

January
January 26: The Southern All-Stars release "Tsunami," the best-selling CD single in Japanese history.

February
February 6: Osaka gubernatorial election - Osaka's first female governor, Fusae Ohta, is elected.

March
March 4: Sony Computer Entertainment's PlayStation 2 goes on sale in Japan.
March 8: Naka-Meguro train disaster
March 31: Mount Usu in Hokkaido erupts for the first time in 23 years.

April
April 1: Ritsumeikan Asia Pacific University opens in Ōita Prefecture.
April 2: Prime Minister Keizo Obuchi suffers a massive stroke and is hospitalized.
April 4: Obuchi cabinet resigns.
April 5: Yoshiro Mori is elected Prime Minister.

May
May 14: Obuchi dies.
May 15: Yoshiro Mori makes his first major gaffe, referring to Japan as a "divine nation centering on the Emperor."

June
June to July: According to Japan Health and Welfare Ministry official confirmed report, an outbreak of food poisoning at dairy factory in Osaka, resulting to 13,420 people being infected, however, there were no reports of any deaths. This was confirmed by an Official, who said this incident was caused by enterotoxin in skimmed milk.
June 25: General election held.

July
July 8: Volcanic eruption on Miyakejima.
July 19: Bank of Japan issues the first 2,000-yen banknotes.
July 21–23: G8 Summit held in Nago, Okinawa.

August
August 1: New 500-yen coins enter circulation.

September

September 2: Miyakejima is evacuated as the eruption continues.
September 12: Heavy torrential rain and flash flood hits Nagoya and its suburbs, according to The Fire and Disaster Management Agency of Japan report, ten people lost their lives, with 115 people injured.
September 19: The Mizuho Financial Group is established, becoming Japan's first bank holding company.

October
October 1: The DDI Corporation, the KDD Corporation and the ODI Corporation merge to become KDDI.
October 6: A magnitude 6.6 earthquake hits the city of Yonago, Tottori, injuring 182 people.
October 27: Chief Cabinet Secretary Hidenao Nakagawa resigns to take responsibility for a sex scandal he was embroiled in; Yasuo Fukuda is appointed in his place.

November
November 8: Japanese Red Army leader Fusako Shigenobu is arrested in Osaka.

The Nobel Prize
 Hideki Shirakawa: 2000 Nobel Prize in Chemistry winner.

Births
January 26 – Shunsuke Izumiya, hurdle athleter 
February 19 – Chisaki Morito, pop singer
February 21 – Yuto Miyazawa, child singer
February 22 – Munetaka Murakami, professional baseball player (Tokyo Swallows)
April 4 – Shosei Togo, professional baseball pitcher (Tokyo Giants)
August 27 – Tatsuomi Hamada, actor and model
August 29 – Minami Hamabe, actress
November 2 – JUNNA, pop singer
November 29 – Rei Kuromiya, singer and gravure idol
December 11 – Rinne Yoshida, idol singer and rapper

Deaths
January 22 – Masao Harada, athlete (b. 1912)
February 7 – Shiho Niiyama, voice actress (b. 1970)
March 7 – Masami Yoshida, javelin thrower (b. 1958)
April 7 – Masayuki Minami, volleyball player (b. 1941)
May 10 – Kaneto Shiozawa, voice actor (b. 1954)
May 13 – Jumbo Tsuruta, wrestler (b. 1951)
May 14 – Keizo Obuchi, prime minister of Japan (b. 1937)
June 16 – Empress Kōjun (b. 1903)
June 19 – Noboru Takeshita, Prime minister of Japan (b. 1924)
June 22 – Osamu Takizawa, actor (b. 1906)
July 23 – Ogura Yuki, painter (b. 1895)
August 12 – Noboru Akiyama, baseball pitcher (b. 1934)
September 22 – Saburō Sakai, naval aviator and flying ace (b. 1916)
October 4 – Masaji Iguro, ski jumper (b. 1913)
October 13 – Masao Fujii, baseball player (b. 1968)
October 25 – Mochitsura Hashimoto, officer in the Imperial Japanese Navy (b. 1909)
October 31 – Kazuki Watanabe, musician (b. 1981)
November 30 – Kiyotaka Katsuta, serial killer (b. 1948)

See also
 2000 in Japanese television
 List of Japanese films of 2000

References

 
Years of the 20th century in Japan
Japan
Japan